Agino Selo is a village in the municipality of Banja Luka, Republika Srpska, Bosnia and Herzegovina.

Demographics 
Ethnic groups in the village include:
449 Serbs (99.12%)
4 Others (0.88%)

References

Villages in Republika Srpska
Populated places in Banja Luka